Milena Ćeranić (born 3 April 1986) is a Montenegrin Serb singer from Kragujevac. She initially gained fame as a contestant on the fourth season of the singing competition Zvezde Granda (2008-2009). In 2010, she competed alongside her than boyfriend and fellow-Zvezde Granda contestant, Nemanja Stevanović on the second season of the reality television show Farma. Because of her profanity on the show, Ćeranić famously faced public scrutiny and lost her recording contract with Grand Production.

She competed on the Pink Music Festival in 2014 and 2015 with the songs "Luda balkanaska" and "Sve pred sobom gazim", respectively.

According to the media reports, Ćeranić was romantically involved with basketball player Vladimir Dašić and recording artist Vuk Mob.

Discography 
Singles

 "Ne Može Ljubav da Nestane" (2009)
 "Tražićeš Mene Ti" (ft Nemanja Stevanović) (2010)
 "Dvadesete Gazim" (2010)
 "Bikini" (ft Juice) (2011)
 "Kabriolet" (2011)
 "Ciganka sam Mala" [cover] (2012)
 "Zbog Tebe mi Prete" (2012)
 "Suze Biserne" (2012)
 "Više od Života" (ft Ćemo) (2012)
 "Noći Jadranske" (ft Dirty boy) (2013)
 "Nedužna" (2013)
 "Pesma sa Posvetom" (2014)
 "Luda Balkanska" (ft DJ Kizami & DJ Marchez) (2014)
 "Miris Leta" (ft Goran Pajić) (2014)
 "Novi List" (2014)
 "Sve Pred Sobom Gazim" (2015)
 "Luda Noć" (ft Danijel Mitrović) (2015)
 "Milimetar Tvoje Kože" (ft Inspiracija bend) (2015)
 "Gad" (ft Stefani Pavlović) (2016)
 "Jeftino" (2017)
 "Barikada" (2017)
 "Šefica" (2018)
 "Povredi Me" (2019)
 "Al Capone" (2020)

Filmography

References

External links 

1986 births
Living people
Musicians from Kragujevac
21st-century Serbian women singers
Serbian folk-pop singers
Grand Production artists